Massacre in Rome is a 1973 Italian war drama film directed by George Pan Cosmatos about the Ardeatine massacre which occurred at the Ardeatine caves in Rome, 24 March 1944, committed by the Germans as a reprisal for a partisan attack against the SS Police Regiment Bozen. The film was based on the 1967 book Death in Rome by Robert Katz. An Italian court gave producer Carlo Ponti and director Cosmatos a six-month suspended sentence for their film which claimed Pope Pius XII knew of and did nothing about the execution of Italian hostages by the Germans. The charges eventually were dropped on appeal. The names of the victims are shown in the closing credits, as opposed to the cast credits and crew members.

Plot

The film stars Richard Burton as the Rome Gestapo chief Herbert Kappler, who carries out the killings of 335 mostly randomly and hurriedly selected victims in revenge for partisans killing 33 Germans: using a ratio of ten Italian victims for every German. However, they had rounded up five more than expected but continued on with their plan. Meanwhile, the Vatican stands by and issues no condemnation.

Cast

SS personnel

 Richard Burton as SS-Obersturmbannführer Herbert Kappler
 John Steiner as SS-Standartenführer Eugen Dollmann
 Anthony Steel as SS-Sturmbannführer Dr. Borante Domizlaff
 Brook Williams as SS-Hauptsturmführer Erich Priebke
 Dennis Burgess as SS-Sturmbannführer Hellmuth Dobbrick
 Anthony Dawson as SS-Brigadeführer Wilhelm Harster

Luftwaffe officers

 Peter Vaughan as Generalfeldmarschall Albert Kesselring
 Leo McKern as General der Flieger Kurt Mälzer

Italian fascists

 Guidarino Guidi as Interior Minister Guido Buffarini Guidi
 Renzo Montagnani as Police Chief "Questore" Pietro Caruso

Vatican officials

 Marcello Mastroianni as Father Pietro Antonelli
 Robert Harris as Father Pancrazio

Other characters

 Giancarlo Prete as Paolo
 Delia Boccardo as Elena
 Renzo Palmer as Giorgio
 Duilio Del Prete as Partisan

Production 
The film is based on the book Death in Rome by Robert Katz, who also wrote the screenplay with Cosmatos.

Trial for libel
The author of the book Death in Rome on which the film was based was involved in a criminal-libel suit in Italy over the contents of his book. The suit was launched by Countess Elisa betta Pacelli Rossignani, the sister of Pope Pius XII. Author Katz, producer Ponti and director Cosmatos were charged with "defaming the memory of the Pope" Pius XII regarding the Pope's alleged knowledge and 
not objecting to the Ardeatine Massacre. All were found guilty with Katz sentenced to 14 months and Ponti and Cosmatos sentence to six months but the charges were rendered moot by a general amnesty.

Historical accuracy 
Herbert Kappler is depicted in the film as being a tired worn out man, who is disillusioned with the Nazi cause and believes that the fall of Nazi Germany is imminent.  In reality, Kappler was a zealous Nazi and was sent to Rome for exactly this reason.  During his time as head of the Sicherheitspolizei (Security Police) in Rome, Kappler organized the round-ups of thousands of innocent victims, oversaw raids on Jewish homes for looted valuables, and was a key figure in transporting Italian Jews to Nazi death camps.

Father Pietro Antonelli is a combination of several different Vatican officials who personally knew Kappler, the most significant of whom was Monsignor Hugh O'Flaherty (who appears in the television film The Scarlet and the Black).  One prisoner, a deserter from the Austrian army who had pretended to be an Italian, was allowed to live, as a citizen of the Reich; and he was the only witness to tell the tale of the courageous behaviour of the Resistance priest, Don Pietro Pappagallo, who blessed those about to be killed, before he himself met his fate.

The SS victims of the partisan attack are referred to throughout the film as "German soldiers", when in fact the company which was attacked was the 11th Company of the Third Battalion of the SS Police Regiment Bozen from the  Bozen", which was composed of ethnic Austrians from German-speaking South Tyrol annexed by Italy after the First World War.  Historically, the unit also did not wear SS uniforms, but rather regular German police uniforms of the Ordnungspolizei.

Kurt Mälzer is shown throughout the film giving direct orders to SS units and personally supervising the buildup to the massacre organized by Kappler.  In reality, while several regular Wehrmacht officers did issue orders to the SS during this period, as well as Kappler and Mälzer personally discussing the operation, Kappler and his men were under the SS and Police Leader chain of command, and it was through these channels that most of the official orders concerning the massacre were issued. Another man working with the SS was Capt. Erich Priebke, who is mentioned in the film. He had full knowledge of the massacre, but would hide for many years evading justice. Then, on Nationwide TV in the 1990s, ABC News reporter Sam Donaldson found and confronted him about the massacre, leading him to say he "followed orders". Argentinian authorities quickly arrested and extradited him to Italy; he was tried and convicted of mass murder.

Colonel Dollmann was never Kappler's direct superior, as is implied several times in the film.  In reality, Kappler answered to the office of SS-Obergruppenführer Karl Wolff, who also maintained his headquarters in Rome.  Wolff is never seen or mentioned in the film. In reality, he stood trial and was found guilty of killing Italian Jews as part of the operations in Italy: when he became sick, his sentence was reduced and he was released in 1971.

At the time of the massacre, Herbert Kappler was 37 years old.  Actor Richard Burton was just short of his 48th birthday when the film was produced, eleven years older than Kappler would have been at the time.

References

External links

Italian Campaign of World War II films
Films set in Rome
1970s war drama films
Italian war drama films
1973 films
1970s Italian-language films
Films directed by George P. Cosmatos
World War II films based on actual events
Films scored by Ennio Morricone
1973 drama films
Films about Nazis
Films about Nazism
Films about massacres
Italian World War II films
English-language Italian films
1970s English-language films
1970s Italian films
English-language drama films